William Reed is a digital, high value data and events business serving the food and drinks sector. In 2021, it had offices in five locations - in Crawley, London, Montpellier, Singapore and Chicago.

Early history
In 1862, William Reed founded his own publishing company, William Reed Publishing in London. With the contacts he had made working in the grocer industry and the knowledge he had gained, he launched his first journal, The Grocer, from his premises based in Bow Lane, London. The Grocer gave readers the latest news and analysis of the trade. A year later the Wine Trade Review launched as a supplement to The Grocer.

By 1864, Reed targeted the brewing industry with Brewers Journal, and its supplement, Hop & Malt Trades Review, and in 1868 he added Tobacco Trade Review to his company's magazine line up. Reed died in 1920; at that time The Grocer was his company's best-known publication, and was used by the Ministry of Food to make announcements.

After Reed's death, his publishing company continued to be operated by his son.

In 2021, the company continues to be owned by later generations of the same family, as the company William Reed Ltd based in Crawley, Sussex.

Brands

References

External links
Official website

Magazine publishing companies of the United Kingdom
Companies based in Crawley
1862 establishments in the United Kingdom